Stéphane Tein-Padom (born 8 June 1994) is a New Caledonian footballer who plays as a forward for FC Balagne.

International career

International goals
Scores and results list New Caledonia's goal tally first.

References

External links
 

Living people
1994 births
New Caledonia international footballers
New Caledonian footballers
People from Nouméa
Association football forwards